Anthony Lakes (also North Powder Lakes) are a group of about 15 lakes and marshes in the Blue Mountains of northeastern Oregon, U.S.

The group contains Grande Ronde Lake, Mud Lake, Floodwater Flats, Anthony Lake, Lilypad Lake, Hoffer Lakes, and several unnamed marshes and shallow lakes.

See also
 Anthony Lakes (ski area)

References

External links
 https://web.archive.org/web/20161012191423/https://www.lagranderide.com/destination/anthony-lakes-elkhorn-mountains-oregon

Lakes of Oregon
Lakes of Baker County, Oregon
Lakes of Union County, Oregon
Landforms of Baker County, Oregon
Landforms of Union County, Oregon
Marshes of Oregon
Wallowa–Whitman National Forest